Camp White Pine is a traditional Summer camp for boys and girls aged 7 to 16, located in Haliburton, Ontario. The camp was built in 1956 on the site of the old Highland Lodge. Founded by Joseph Kronick, In 1986, Joe's son Adam assumed leadership of the camp, later to be joined by his wife Dana.

Activities include swimming, water-skiing, sailing, windsurfing, fitness, pottery, glass, copper, arts and crafts, canoeing, tennis, ropes, landsports (including in-line hockey and basketball), drama, mountain biking, woodworking, mini-golf, school of rock, media arts and outdoor recreation. The camp also offers a wide variety of overnight and day trips, including canoe trips, sail trips, biking trips, tennis tour, and intercamp sports.

There are many special activities planned throughout the summer, whether it be camp-wide dances, the All-Day program or the Midnight Special.

Campers are divided into age groups, or "Sections" each with its own unique animal name. These are Kiwis, Koalas, Blue Dolphins, Red Dolphins, Gnus and the Training Village (TVs). These names were parodied by Bill Murray in the 1979 film Meatballs, which was filmed at the camp.

Location

Camp White Pine is found in Haliburton, Ontario. The camp is on Hurricane Lake (goes by Lake Placid).

Notable former campers
 Writer Margaret Atwood
 Filmmaker Beryl Fox
 Artist Charles Pachter
 Writer Rick Salutin
 Television writer David Shore
John Podhoretz

Popular culture
Camp White Pine was featured in the 1979 film Meatballs as the fictional Camp North Star.

References

External links
 Camp White Pine's website
 Atwood: a critical companion By Nathalie Cooke (Google Books)

White Pine
Buildings and structures in Haliburton County